The women's 20 kilometres walk at the 2012 Summer Olympics in London, United Kingdom, was held on 11 August on a route along The Mall and Constitution Hill.

Summary
From the start of the race, defending champion Olga Kaniskina took the lead, only Liu Hong would go with her.  The two opened up a big gap with a chase pack of a Guatemalan, the other 2 Russians, other 2 Chinese.  By the end of 8K the pack began to lose walkers, Mirna Ortíz and  Johanna Jackson were disqualified, and Liu began to lose contact, Kaniskina off on her own.  Shortly after the half way mark, the pack was down to Elena Lashmanova and Anisya Kirdyapkina leading  Xiuzhi Lu and Qieyang Shijie  An hour into the race and Lu began to lose contact, Lashmanova, Kirdyapkina and Qieyang chasing and then swallowing up Liu.  By 14 km Kaniskina had a 33-second lead.   Almost unnoticeable, the gap between Kaniskina and the chasers had come down to 24 seconds at 16 km, Kirdyapkina and then Liu struggling to stay with the group.  After another 2K lap, the gap was down to 17 seconds at 18 km, still seemingly insurmountable with just one lap to go.  With Kaniskina looking strong, the gap kept falling.  Kaniskina started to show the strain, as the pass became inevitable she began the most pronounced arm swing trying to find that last bit of speed, but it wasn't enough.  Less than 200 metres from the finish Lashmanova went by Kaniskina and on to the gold carpet. Lashmanova finished with a 1:25:02 world record. Broken Kaniskina finished 7 seconds back, just a second slower than the previous world record.  Qieyang happily finished another 7 seconds later for bronze.  After the finish, Kaniskina was barely able to walk, while a fresh Lashmanova celebrated her victory.

Later, all three Russians were disqualified for doping violations, and their results annulled. After the medal reallocation, the Chinese gained a podium sweep, with the gold medal for Shenjie Qieyang, silver for Liu Hong, and bronze for Lü Xiuzhi.

Records
, the existing world and Olympic records were as follows.

The following records were established during the competition:

Elena Lashmanova's performance in the final was initially considered a world record, but was later rescinded retroactively due to a doping violation.

Schedule

All times are British Summer Time (UTC+1)

Results

On 24 March 2016, the Court of Arbitration for Sport has issued a decision that all competitive results obtained by Olga Kaniskina from 15 August 2009 to 15 October 2012 are disqualified for doping. The medals and places were reallocated. Anisya Kirdyapkina was also disqualified for doping.

On 21 March 2022, the Athletics Integrity Unit has issued a 2-year ban for Elena Lashmanova, starting from 9 March 2021, and also disqualified her results from 18 February 2012, to 3 January 2014.

References

Athletics at the 2012 Summer Olympics
Racewalking at the Olympics
2012 in women's athletics
Women's events at the 2012 Summer Olympics